Saunders Mountain is a massive islandlike mountain rising to 975 m at the west end of Denfeld Mountains, Ford Ranges, on the Saunders Coast, Marie Byrd Land. Discovered by the Byrd Antarctic Expedition on an aerial flight of December 5, 1929, and named by R. Admiral Byrd after Captain Harold E. Saunders, U.S. Navy (1890–1961), naval architect, cartographer and toponymist; chief cartographer of the Byrd Antarctic Expedition of 1928-30 and 1933–35, who compiled maps of this coast from aerial photographs obtained by the Byrd expeditions; Technical Director, David Taylor Model Basin, Carderock, MD, 1940-46 (Director, 1946–47); Consultant to Bureau of Ships, U.S. Navy, to 1961; member of US-SCAN, 1943–46; Chairman, Advisory Committee on Antarctic Names (US-ACAN), 1947–61.

Mountains of Marie Byrd Land